The Great Lakes Lacrosse League (GLLL) is a regional organization of non-varsity men's club field lacrosse programs in the Midwestern United States. The GLLL was founded in 2004 to provide a competitive league for teams in the Midwest who want to play in a well-organized league outside of NCAA restrictions and without the expense of being a "virtual varsity."

The GLLL has 40 teams from eight different states: Illinois, Indiana, Iowa, Michigan, Minnesota, North Dakota, South Dakota, and Wisconsin. The league is divided into six geographic divisions. Members of the GLLL strive to find a greater balance between athletics, personal life and academics. The season culminates each year with a championship tournament.

History
The GLLL originally formed with nine club teams in 2004. The founding teams were: Carleton College, Loyola University Chicago, Northern Michigan University, St. Norbert College, University of Wisconsin, University of Wisconsin–La Crosse, University of Wisconsin–Platteville, University of Wisconsin–Whitewater and Mad Cow Lacrosse Club (Milwaukee).

League play 
GLLL league play consists of several mini-tourneys per season where multiple teams play each other at one site. Playing two games in a day allows teams to get their regular season schedule of approximately 8–10 games completed over five weekends in the spring. The season culminates in the championship tournament weekend in which all teams participate and are seeded by regional rankings.

The GLLL is grouped into six divisions. Each division winner receives a championship plaque for their season and, along with two wildcard clubs, compete for the championship title. The remaining teams compete in a second-tier consolation bracket. Trophies are awarded for first through third place in both championship and consolation brackets. This format allows both strong teams and developing programs a more competitive experience.

Teams by division

Central Division 
 Marquette
 Northern Michigan/Michigan Tech
 Wisconsin Grey
 Wisconsin Red
 Wisconsin White
 UW-Milwaukee
 UW-Stevens Point
 UW-Whitewater
 UW-Platteville

Chicago Division 
 Bradley University
 University of Chicago
 DePaul University
 University of Illinois-Chicago
 Lake Forest College
 Loyola University Chicago
 Northern Illinois
 Northwestern University
 Saint Xavier University
 Western Illinois University

Eastern Division 
 Holy Cross (IN)
 Michigan
 Michigan State
 Northwood
 Notre Dame Blue
 Notre Dame Gold

North Division 
 Bethel University
 St. Cloud State
 St. Olaf
 UW-Eau Claire
 UW-River Falls
 UW-Stout

Western Division 
 Carleton
 Gustavus Adolphus
 Iowa
 Minnesota State-Mankato
 North Dakota
 South Dakota State
 UW-La Crosse
 Winona State

GLLL Championship history

References

External links
 

College lacrosse leagues in the United States
College club sports associations in the United States